Amer Kadrić (born 12 October 1994) is a Bosnian-Herzegovinian footballer who plays as a midfielder for ZFC Meuselwitz.

References

External links
 Profile on FuPa.net

1994 births
Living people
Bosnia and Herzegovina footballers
Bosnia and Herzegovina expatriate footballers
Bosnia and Herzegovina expatriate sportspeople in Germany
Expatriate footballers in Germany
Association football midfielders
FC Rot-Weiß Erfurt players
SC Wiedenbrück 2000 players
VfB Auerbach players
3. Liga players
Regionalliga players